MV Salahuddin-2 was a ferry that sank in the Meghna River south of Dhaka, Bangladesh in the night of 3 May 2002, killing more than 450 people.

References

Further reading

External links
 Maritime Matters Shipping News: Passenger ship and cruise news from around the world, Jan 2002 to June 2002

2002 disasters in Bangladesh
Ferries of Bangladesh
Maritime incidents in Bangladesh
Maritime incidents in 2002
Shipwrecks in rivers
2002 in Bangladesh